Raden Inoe Perbatasari (before 1929–1954) was an Indonesian politician turned film director and actor.

Perbatasari, who had a background in journalism and had previously led the dailies Oetoesan Indonesia and Bintang Timoer, was politically active in the late 1920s as a member of the Indonesian National Party, a native political party in the Dutch East Indies. By the 1930s, he was active in the Bolero touring troupe, under Andjar Asmara. When Andjar went to Java Industrial Film to become a director for The Teng Chun, Perbatasari was one of several Bolero members to join. They appeared in their first production, Kartinah, in 1940. The film, which followed the love between a nurse and her superior, featured Perbatasari as Ratna Asmara's character's uncle.

The following year saw Perbatasari active in three films. Aside from a minor role in Ratna Moetoe Manikam, he made his directorial debut with Elang Darat, which was published by JIF's subsidiary Jacatra Pictures. Elang Darat was a detective story which followed an inspector named Parlan in his investigation of a bandit known only as "Elang Darat". Perbatasari's second film, Poetri Rimba (Jungle Princess), followed a hunter as he attempted to escape from bandits.

After the Empire of Japan occupied the Indies beginning in 1942, Perbatasari collaborated with the Japanese forces in making the propaganda film Hoedjan for the studio Nippon Eigasha. He also worked at the Japanese-led Cultural Centre in Jakarta.

Perbatasari is recorded as working on three films after Indonesia was formally recognised in 1949. The first, Djiwa Pemuda, was released in 1951. The screenplay, Perbatasari's only contribution to the film, followed two former guerrillas from the National Revolution feuding over a woman's love. This was followed by two directorial works: Sekuntum Bunga Ditepi Danau (A Bouquet of Flowers on the Lake Shore; 1952) and Kembali ke Masjarakat (Return to the People; 1954), both of which dealt with the revolution.

Perbatasari died at Cikini Hospital in Jakarta on 18 October 1954. He did most of his post-revolution work with the National Film Company (Perusahaan Film Nasional), working in management.

Filmography
During his career Perbatasari directed five films (including one short) and acted in two. He also wrote several films.

Actor
Kartinah (1940)
Ratna Moetoe Manikam (1941)

Crew
Elang Darat (1941) – Director and screenwriter
Poetri Rimba (Jungle Princess; 1941) – Director
Hoedjan (Rain; 1944; short film) – Director and screenwriter
Djiwa Pemuda (Soul of the Youth; 1951) – Screenwriter
Sekuntum Bunga Ditepi Danau (A Bouquet of Flowers on the Lake Shore; 1952) – Director and screenwriter
Kembali ke Masjarakat (Return to the People; 1954) – Director

References
Footnotes

Bibliography

 

 
 

 

1929 births
1954 deaths
20th-century screenwriters
Film directors of the Dutch East Indies
Indonesian collaborators with Imperial Japan
Indonesian film directors
Indonesian National Party politicians
Indonesian screenwriters
Screenwriters of the Dutch East Indies